The 1995 Bank of Scotland World Junior Curling Championships were held in Perth, Scotland March 19–26.

Men's

Playoffs

Women's

Tiebreaker
 7-5

Playoffs

Sources

J
1995 in Scottish sport
World Junior Curling Championships
Sport in Perth, Scotland
International curling competitions hosted by Scotland
March 1995 sports events in the United Kingdom
1995 in youth sport